Boisbriand is an off-island suburb of Montreal, in southwestern Quebec, Canada, on the north shore of the Rivière des Mille Îles in the Thérèse-De Blainville Regional County Municipality.

The Hasidic community of Kiryas Tosh is located within the city limits and make up about 10% of its population. The rapidly growing community of 470 families and about 2,700 people was home to the former Tosher Rebbe, Meshulim Feish (Ferencz) Lowy, who established the community in 1963.

Although relatively small, Boisbriand is bisected by three highways: Highway 13 on the west, Highway 15 on the east, and Highway 640 in the middle/north.

Demographics 

Sport
Boisbriand is home to the Blainville-Boisbriand Armada of the Quebec Major Junior Hockey League. The Armada play their home games at Centre d'Excellence Sports Rousseau.

The city promotes several sports teams of different categories like minor hockey, aquatic club, athletics club, fencing, karate, synchronized swimming, figure skating.

Education
The Commission scolaire de la Seigneurie-des-Mille-Îles (CSSMI) operates Francophone public schools.
 École secondaire Jean-Jacques-Rousseau 
 École de la Clairière
 École des Grands-Chemins
 École du Mai
 École Gabrielle-Roy
 École Gaston-Pilon
 École Le Sentier
Some areas are served by École Le Tandem in Sainte-Thérèse.

Sir Wilfrid Laurier School Board operates Anglophone schools:
 Pierre Elliot Trudeau Elementary School in Blainville
 Rosemere High School in Rosemère

Climate 
The climate of Boisbriand is a humid continental climate. Winters are cold with a lot of snowfall and summers are hot and humid. There are 4 seasons spring, summer, autumn and winter.

Twin cities
France, Annemasse

References

External links

Ville de Boisbriand (French)

 
Cities and towns in Quebec